Tuyeh (also Romanized as Tūyeh; also known as Tū-ye Darbār) is a village in Tuyehdarvar Rural District, Amirabad District, Damghan County, Semnan Province, Iran. At the 2006 census, its population was 339, in 137 families.

References 

Populated places in Damghan County